Daniel Cukierman (born 9 July 1995) is an Israeli tennis player.

During his junior year at the University of Southern California from November 13, 2019, until the close of competition in 2020, Cukierman was ranked No. 1 in the US in singles among men’s college tennis players in the 2019–20 Intercollegiate Tennis Association (ITA) Division I Men’s Individual National Rankings.

Cukierman has a career-high ATP singles ranking of 408, achieved on November 7, 2022. He also has a career-high ATP doubles ranking of 256, achieved on November 7, 2022.

Early life
Cukierman was born in Tel Aviv, Israel, to Galia and businessman Edouard Cukierman (chairman of Cukierman & Co. Investment House).  He has two brothers, Michael and Ariel. He attended Ironi Daled High School in Tel Aviv.

He was in the Israel Defense Forces for three years. After Cukierman was released from the IDF, Cukierman had a mandatory eight-month break from competition.

Tennis career
When he was 18 years of age, Cukierman started training with Israeli Amos Mansdorf, and won an Israel championship. While in high school, he won the Israeli doubles title.

Cukierman reached the singles finals at the 2016 Greece F9 Futures, and the 2016 Israel F14 Futures and F13 Futures, and reached the doubles final at the 2016 Israel F15 Futures. In December 2017, he won the Israel National Championship in doubles. In December 2019, he won the Israel National Championship in singles.

In January 2020, partnering with Riley Smith, Cukierman won the M25 Los Angeles doubles championship.

College
In 2017 Cukierman started his studies at the University of Southern California (USC), where he is playing for the USC Trojans tennis team. Cukierman said: "My feeling is to go to college, and after college, I can go pro and try my chances. And if it doesn’t work, I have my degree, so I’ll have other options. I feel like it’s better to start studying when you’re 22 (because I was in the Army) than when you’re 32." He began as an international relations major, and switched to real estate development.

In his freshman year in 2017–18 he was ranked No. 62 in the US in singles, and won All-Pac-12 Second Team honors.  Cukierman went 16–5 in singles and 15–4 in doubles with Tanner Smith, and at the Intercollegiate Tennis Association (ITA) National Team Indoor Championships he was named to the All-Tournament Team at No. 3 doubles.

At the close of his sophomore year in 2018–19 Cukierman was ranked No. 21 in the US in singles, having reached No. 4 in singles and No. 21 in doubles rankings on February 6, 2019. He was named to All-Pac-12 First Team, and received Pac-12 All-Academic Honorable Mention. He went 34–11 in singles. In doubles, he was 26–11, playing again primarily with Tanner Smith. In October 2018, he won the Southern California Intercollegiate Singles title.  He also won the Oracle ITA National Fall Singles Championship.

While team captain during his junior year, from November 13, 2019, until the close of competition in 2020, Cukierman was ranked No. 1 in the US in singles among men’s college tennis players in the 2019–20 ITA Division I Men’s Individual National Rankings. He was the first USC player to be ranked #1 in the nation since Steve Johnson in 2012. He was 26–2 in singles in 2019–20. He won the singles title and the doubles title (with Riley Smith) at the Sherwood Collegiate Cup in Thousand Oaks, California, and also won the Oracle Pro Series ITA Masters championships in singles and doubles (also with Smith). He and Smith ranked No. 5 in the US in doubles when competition was cancelled due to the COVID-19 pandemic in the United States. He was the Pac-12 Player of the Week on January 21 and February 18, 2020, and the UTR/ITA Player of the Week on February 18.  He was named to the ITA National Team Indoor Championship All-Tournament team at No. 2 singles, and at No. 1 doubles with Smith. He was also named a 2020 ITA All-American.

National representation

Davis Cup
Cukierman plays for the Israel Davis Cup team in the Davis Cup. He was first nominated to the team for the 2017 Davis Cup, and played in a match against Portuguese tennis player Frederico Ferreira Silva. In March 2020 he won both singles (defeating  Cem Ilkel, ranked #195 in the world, 7–6(4), 6–2 and doubles (with Australian Open doubles champion Jonathan Erlich; defeating Yanki Erel and Ilkel, 6–3, 6–1) matches against Turkey at the Davis Cup Group 1 qualifiers in Antalya, Turkey.

References

External links

"Sports SCene Season 9, Episode 3: Daniel Cukierman In-Studio," Annenberg Media, February 20, 2019
"USTA SoCal Exclusive: Meet USC Trojans Tanner Smith and Daniel Cukierman," USTA Southern California, May 20, 2019

1996 births
Living people
Israeli Jews
Israeli male tennis players
Sportspeople from Tel Aviv
Jewish tennis players
Israeli people of French-Jewish descent
USC Trojans men's tennis players